Peter Andersen is a 1941 Danish family film directed by Svend Methling and starring Carl Alstrup.

Cast
 Carl Alstrup - Peter Andersen
 Erika Voigt - Fru Ebba Andersen
 Poul Reichhardt - Harald Andersen
 Inger Lassen - Jenny Andersen
 Asta Hansen - Benna
 Gudrun Stephensen - Gertrud
 Edgar Hansen - Artist Ewald Madsen
 Victor Montell - Sagfører Sigurd Jonsen
 Ingrid Matthiessen - Hushjælpen Agda
 Marie Niedermann - Fru Rasmussen
 Aage Fønss - Grosserer Helge Appel
 Bjarne Forchhammer - Læge Jens Broby
 Sigurd Langberg - Direktør Andersen
 Anna Henriques-Nielsen - Rengøringskone
 Aage Redal

External links

1941 films
1940s Danish-language films
Danish black-and-white films
Films directed by Svend Methling
1941 drama films
Danish drama films